Kharab may refer to:
10¹¹ in the Indian numbering system
Kharab (toponymy), a component of some Arabic placenames meaning "ruined"
Mamta Kharab, Indian women's hockey player

See also